Omm ol Heyal (also Romanized as Omm ol Ḩeyal; also known as Malḩas-e Omm ol Ḩīl) is a village in Azadeh Rural District, Moshrageh District, Ramshir County, Khuzestan Province, Iran. At the 2006 census, its population was 212, in 36 families.

References 

Populated places in Ramshir County